José Jaime Ordiales Domínguez (born 23 December 1963) is a Mexican former professional footballer who played as a midfielder.

He was a member of the Mexico national team at the 1998 FIFA World Cup, and played two games at the tournament at age 35.

He was named as manager of Tecos UAG in January 2008. He was fired on 9 March 2008 and replaced by José Luis Trejo. In July 2008, Ordiales became the Sports Director of Club América from Mexico. He served as the coach of 2nd division team Club de Fútbol Correcaminos de la Universidad Autónoma de Tamaulipas. In 2020, he was named the president of CD Cruz Azul.

References

External links

Living people
Association football midfielders
1998 FIFA World Cup players
Mexico international footballers
Club Necaxa footballers
Club León footballers
Cruz Azul footballers
Club Puebla players
Coyotes Neza footballers
C.D. Guadalajara footballers
C.F. Pachuca players
Deportivo Toluca F.C. players
Tecos F.C. footballers
Mexican football managers
Tecos F.C. managers
Footballers from Mexico City
Mexican footballers
Liga MX managers
Club Necaxa managers
1963 births
Querétaro F.C. non-playing staff